Samuel Van Dyke Stout (1786–1850) was an American Whig politician. He served as the Mayor of Nashville, Tennessee from 1841 to 1842.

Early life
Samuel Van Dyke Stout was born on April 18, 1786, in Redstone Fort, Fayette County, Pennsylvania. His father, Abraham Stout, was silver plater. His mother, Jane Pettit. He grew up in Kentucky and moved to Nashville in 1811.

Career
Stout settled in Nashville, Tennessee in 1811. He first worked for his father's silver plating business. He subsequently opened a carriage factory on Clark Street. His business became successful, and he is credited with making the carriage that President Andrew Jackson rode on his journey from Nashville to Washington, D.C. for his inauguration on March 4, 1829.

Stout served on the Nashville Board of Aldermen from 1824 to 1825, 1830 to 1832, 1835 to 1837, 1838 to 1839, in 1844, and from 1846 to 1850. He served as Mayor of Nashville from 1841 to 1842. He was a freemason.

Personal life and death
Stout married Catherine Tannehill in Nashville on October 12, 1813 at the home of Catherine's brother, Wilkins F. Tannehill, who would later himself serve as the city mayor. They had three sons, Josiah W., Charles C., Samuel H., and three daughters, Margaret Jane, Ira Abraham, and Catherine. They resided on First Avenue in Nashville, Tennessee. He attended the First Presbyterian Church.

Stout died of apoplexy on August 8, 1850. He was buried in the Nashville City Cemetery.

References

1786 births
1850 deaths
People from Fayette County, Pennsylvania
Tennessee Whigs
19th-century American politicians
Mayors of Nashville, Tennessee
American Freemasons